Steven Kakuna Kari (born 13 May 1993 in Port Moresby) is a Papua New Guinean weightlifter competing in the men's 85 kg and later 94 kg category.

85kg
The youngest member of the Papua New Guinea team, he finished 15th at the 2012 Summer Olympics. Kari won the gold medal at the 2011 Pacific Games.

94kg
Kari won gold at the 2014 Commonwealth Games in the Men's 94 kg class.

References

External links

Papua New Guinean male weightlifters
1993 births
Living people
Weightlifters at the 2012 Summer Olympics
Olympic weightlifters of Papua New Guinea
Weightlifters at the 2010 Summer Youth Olympics
People from the National Capital District (Papua New Guinea)
Weightlifters at the 2014 Commonwealth Games
Commonwealth Games gold medallists for Papua New Guinea
Commonwealth Games medallists in weightlifting
Medallists at the 2014 Commonwealth Games